Events during the year 1996 in Poland.

Incumbents

Events 

 18 February – A double referendum is held. The voter turnout of 32% is well below the 50% threshold required to make the results valid.

Births 
 13 January: Kamil Majchrzak, tennis player
 2 May: Klaudia Kardasz, shot putter

Deaths 
 26 February: Mieczysław Weinberg, composer (born 1919)
 13 March: Krzysztof Kieślowski, film director and screenwriter (born 1941)

References 

 

pl:1996#Wydarzenia w Polsce